"The Restaurant of Many Orders" is a short story by the Japanese author Kenji Miyazawa.

Synopsis 
Two gentlemen in Western-style dress go hunting in the woods, accompanied by two dogs and a guide. After a day of hunting, they have failed to capture any game, they have become separated from their guide, and their dogs suddenly drop dead. As the two gentlemen lament their losses and trudge forward, they suddenly turn to find a large Western-style house with a sign reading, "Restaurant Wildcat House Western-Style Cooking". The hungry gentlemen, though unnerved, enter the restaurant to encounter a series of doors that open before and close behind them. Each door is preceded by a sign, the first few of which bear double-entendre messages of welcome. The gentlemen interpret these signs, apologizing for the restaurant's "many orders", as indicating the restaurant's popularity and quality. Later signs bear commands (the Japanese 注文 chūmon having the same two senses as the English "orders") instructing the men to undress and rub themselves with strange substances. All the while, growing hungrier and colder, the men speculate about the fine food and diners they expect to find in a restaurant so discerning.

Finally, the men realize they cannot go back and realize that they will be devoured by the proprietor of the house if they approach the last door. In a deus ex machina, their previously dead dogs return to fight the demons lying behind the final door and the house vanishes into mist. The gentlemen are rejoined by their guide, and they return to Tokyo forever traumatized by the experience.

Writer’s thoughts 
Kenji had been thinking about disadvantages of his birth of place, Tohoku area. 
For example, Tohoku area has very harsh nature which is strongly related to death or poverty. 
Meanwhile, he also believes that human can live with nature through agriculture. 
Kenji's region is Nichiren sect of Buddhism. Nichiren sect has truth called Issinhokai. It means that the universe equally has the unique and absolute rule.
These points reflect this work.

Interesting points of work 
Firstly, two gentlemen's clothes look like sailor clothes. They come forest to hunt wild animals. But their look isn't fit to their purpose. It is often said that Kenji criticized western civilization symbolized two gentlemen. 
Secondly, two gentlemen accept almost strange orders. They were very hungry and tired. So, they lost normal ability to think. Precautionary statement is written language. Written language is unidirectional communication tool. They were forced to interpret it what is convenient to them. Therefore, their interpretations are so funny.

Film Adaptations 

 1958 - Chūmon no ōi ryōriten (puppet animation)
 1993 - Chūmon no ōi ryōriten (animation)
 2012 - Chūmon no ōi ryōriten (in Bungo sasayaka na yokubo)

TV Adaptations 

 Getsuyō Onna no Suspense (Bungo series)
 Aired December 10, 1990 (TV Tokyo)
 80nen go no Kenji - Miyzawa Kenji Eizō Dōwa shū
Aired February 20, 2013 (NHK BS Premium) commemorating 80th anniversary of Miyazawa Kenji's death.
Director: Shibue Shūhei
Cast: Yoshiyoshi Arakawa, Sarutoki Minagawa, Yasoda Yūichi

See also 

 Miyazawa Kenji
 Night on the Galactic Railroad
 Kaze no Matasaburō
 Gauche the Cellist
 List of Japanese writers

Further reading 

 Full text of "The Restaurant of Many Orders"  in the original Japanese from the Aozora electronic library
Full English translation of "The Restaurant With Many Orders" from Wikisource
e-texts of Kenji Miyazawa's works at Aozora Bunko

References 

1924 children's books
1924 novels
20th-century Japanese novels
Japanese children's novels
Japanese fantasy novels
Works by Kenji Miyazawa